Daewangam Park is a resting place in Ilsan, Dong-gu in the city of Ulsan.
Daewangam Park is famous for its lighthouse the guidance of the 'Ulgi'. 
From the entrance to the park to the lighthouse, there is a 600-meter-long pine forest spanning.
On the beaches of Daewangam Park, there are huge boulders of rock formations that look like prehistoric dinosaur fossils are lying down.
At the end of the park, there is Daewangam. Daegwanggyo Bridge, which connects land and Daewangam, was built and donated by Hyundai Heavy Industries Co. in 1995.

At night, a subtle neon light encloses surrounding the Daewangam and creates a unique atmosphere. In connection with the scenic beauty of the night, Daewangam Moonlight Festival has been held since 2012.
Daewangam Moonlight Festival is a representative cultural event of Ulsan Dong-gu, which is held every year since 2012. Usually, it opens at Daewangam Park during the evening of September to October. In 2017, the event was titled 'The Hundred Years of Light meets the Thausand Years of Sound.' It is performed various cultural performances such as Si-nangsong, dance, and singing. And after the performances, 'Walking along the moonlight' is proceed. There are about 1000 participants attending the event.

And Daewangam Solbaramgil walking festival has been held in 2017.
It is a walking festival hosted by Ulsan Dong-gu, the theme of "Let's be drunk with the scent of pine trees and waves." 
The walking course is 4.1km long and walks from Daewangam Park to nearby Ilsan beach. 
Around 1,300 people attend this walk festival.

Relevant legends
This Daewangam has a legend about the 'Queen of Munmu', the Silla Dynasty. The Queen of Munmu passed away after his husband (King Munmu)'s death. 
And, she reportedly lost at sea to become a dragon to protect donghae.

See also
 Yeongnam Alps
 Jangsaengpo Whale museum 
 Ulsan Grand Park
 Ganjeolgot

References

External links
Official website

Silla
Ulsan